Arthur Wood may refer to:

Arthur Wood (composer) (1875–1953), English composer
Arthur Wood (cricketer, born 1844) (1844–1933), English cricketer who played for Hampshire
Arthur Wood (American cricketer) (1861–1947), American cricketer
Arthur Wood (cricketer, born 1898) (1898–1973), English Test cricketer
Arthur Wood (cricketer, born 1892) (1892–1951), English cricketer
Arthur Wood (footballer, born 1890) (1890–1977), English football forward with Gillingham, Fulham and Queens Park Rangers
Arthur Wood (footballer, born 1894) (1894–1941), English football goalkeeper with Southampton and Clapton Orient
Arthur Wood (rugby league), rugby league footballer of the 1950s for England, Featherstone Rovers, and Leeds
Arthur Wood (sailor) (1875–1939), Olympic sailor (1908)
Arthur O'Hara Wood (1890–1918), former Australian male tennis player
Arthur Wood (artist)
Arthur Wood (businessman), former President of Sears Roebuck
Arthur Wood, keyboardist  in the Climax Blues Band